Federal Highway 58 (Carretera Federal 58) (Fed. 58) is a free (libre) part of the federal highways corridors (los corredores carreteros federales) of Mexico. The highway travels from San Roberto Junction, Nuevo León in the west to Linares, Nuevo León in the east.

References

058